Dean Rankine is an Australian comics artist, writer and illustrator. Rankine's work has appeared in many comics, books and magazines.

Career
His early comics appeared in many children's magazines - Mania, Explore, Krash, KidZone and Challenge. His own characters have included "Grossgirl and Boogerboy" in Mania and "In the Wild With Maggie and Mitch" in Explore (Pearson Education). He became a Dandy artist in issue 3571 and has drawn the mini-strips 'My Mum Is A Brain Eating Zombie', 'Flatman and Ribbon', 'The Shrimpsons', 'Simon's Bowel' and 'Teenage Mutant Ninja Turkeys' for that title. Rankine is a regular guest and presenter at Australian Comic Conventions.

He has gone on to work on Simpsons Comics. His other credits include; Futurama, Rick and Morty, Invader Zim, Underdog, Oggy and the Cockroaches and The Riverdale Diaries : Starring Veronica. He illustrated the Timmy the Ticked-Off Pony series - written by Magda Szubanski. And wrote and illustrated - Death Metal Emo Elves.

Credits
Over the past 20 years, his credits include Simpsons and Futurama comics (Bongo), Rick and Morty (Oni) Australian MAD Magazine, Hellboy (Dark Horse), Skottie Young's I Hate Fairyland (Image), the iconic Dandy and Beano magazines (DC Thomson), Itty Bitty Bunnies in Rainbow Pixie Candy Land (Action Lab Entertainment). He has also illustrated books for Scholastic (including A Funny Thing Happened to Simon Sidebottom), Pearson Australia and Penguin Books (The Stuff Happens series).

Beginning in 2001, Rankine's Simpsons and Bart Simpsons Comics (Bongo) contributions include: 
 Simpsons Comics #180, #182, #183, #184, #186, #200, #211, #225, #228, 
 Futurama Comics #62, 
 Bongo's Two One-Shot Wonders in One #1, 
 Bart Simpson's Pal, Milhouse #1
 Simpsons Winter Wingding #7, #10, 
 Bongo Comics Free-For-All' 2013 & 2014 
 The Malevolent Mr. Burns #1
 Bart Simpson Comics #78, #80, #82, #83, #87, #89, #91, #94, #95, #98, #99 
 The Greatest Bartman Stories Ever Told' #1 and 
 Jimbo Jones #1.  

Other Matt Groening Productions include Bartman: The Superhero's Handbook (Vault of Simpsonology) and Bartman Trading Cards.

His other credits include; Futurama (Bongo) Hellboy Winter Special 2016 #1 (Dark Horse Comics), I Hate Fairyland #13 (Image Comics) and 'Itty Bitty Bunnies in Rainbow Pixie Candy Land' #1, #2, #3, #4, #5, #6 and Itty Bitty Bunnies: Cavalcade of Contraband (TPB) and Friendgasm (TPB) (Action Lab Entertainment), The 'Stuff Happens' series (Penguin Books), Australian MAD Magazine (Next Media) and Oggy and the Cockroaches (American Mythology Productions). Rankine authored the webcomic Holy Cow! Christian Comics, which he hosted on Webcomics Nation.

Awards
In 2015, he received a Ledger Award for Itty Bitty Bunnies: Save X-mas, recognising excellence in Australian Comics.

In 2020 he received the Stan Cross Award in Book Illustration from the Australian Cartoonists' Association (ACA).

References

 Operation Funnybone edited by Glen Shearer. Melbourne, Vic.: Operation Funnybone, 2005.

External links
 Holy Cow! Christian Comics (archived) on Webcomics Nation
 Dean Rankine's "God's Love is Like a Conjoined Twin" Inspired!Comics

Australian comics artists
Australian cartoonists
Living people
Australian webcomic creators
The Beano people
Year of birth missing (living people)